Naandhi ( Beginning) is a 2021 Indian Telugu-language crime courtroom drama film directed by debutant Vijay Kanakamedala and produced by 'Naandhi' Satish Varma. The film stars Allari Naresh and Varalaxmi Sarathkumar while Priyadarshi, Harish Uthaman, Vinay Varma, and Praveen play supporting roles. The film has music composed by Sricharan Pakala with cinematography performed by Sid. The plot follows the life of Surya Prakash (Naresh), an undertrial prisoner who is falsely accused of murder, awaiting judgement.

Released on 19 February 2021, Naandhi opened to highly positive reviews. The film is a commercial success, grossing over 9.5 crore at the box office. A Hindi remake has been announced with Ajay Devgn as the lead under the production of Dil Raju.

Producer 'Naandhi' Satish Varma won SIIMA 2022 Best Debutant Producer Award (Telugu category) for Naandhi.

Sakshi Excellence Jury Special Recognition Award 2021 has been awarded to producer 'Naandhi' Satish Varma for the movie Naandhi on 21st Oct 2022.

Plot
Surya Prakash is an honest software engineer, living with his parents. His only aim is to fulfil the dreams of his parents, which they sacrificed for his upbringing. Soon, Surya gets engaged to Meenakshi. Meanwhile, tensions arise in the state, after the death of an honest and truthful lawyer Rajagopal. The police are under immense pressure to arrest the murderer. The in-charge of the case, CI Kishore, pulls Surya into the case, arresting him by falsely accusing him of killing Rajagopal. This is after he gets a contract, worth 10 lakhs INR, which Surya actually took as a loan, for buying a house. Kishore creates and plants fake evidence. Surya is astonished as all the people, who can prove Surya's innocence, turn hostile, after being threatened by Kishore. Surya becomes an undertrial prisoner and Kishore tortures him to make him accept the crime, but Surya stands his ground. Surya's parents commit suicide, by immolating themselves, which devastates Surya. At the funeral ground of his parents, Kishore reveals to Surya that he only forced his parents to commit suicide, for not torturing Surya in jail. Surya becomes infuriated and beats up Kishore, due to which he is charged with another case. Helpless, Meenakshi leaves Surya and ends their relationship.

After four years, Surya's case is still in court and he is a broken man. He meets Radha Prakash, a controversial YouTube star and narrates his story. Later, Advocate Aadhya comes forward and succeeds in bailing Surya, but Surya brutally thrashes up some imprisoned goons, who beat him up, with no reason, as per Kishore's plan. Surya again ends up in jail. Radha Prakash is revealed to be Aadhya's brother, and he recorded the incident, in which the goons mistreated Surya. The video gets uploaded on the Internet, resulting in a Human Rights Officer meeting Surya in jail. Upon Surya's request, his case goes to the Fast Track High Court, with Aadhya as his defence Lawyer. Aadhya proves Surya's innocence and he is acquitted of the accusations. Aadhya and Radha Prakash are revealed to be Rajagopal's prodigies. Surya decides to take revenge on Kishore, using IPC Section 211. Satyamurthy becomes Kishore's defence lawyer, for the case. Surya abducts Chandraiah, Kishore's assistant, who testified against Surya in Rajagopal's murder case. Chandraiah reveals that Kishore bribed two goons to kill Rajagopal, but upon pressure from the opposition party, he decided to capture them. 

The goons learned of the truth and escaped, which caused Kishore to pull Surya into the case, using a co-incidence as evidence. Chandraiah accepts to reveal the truth in court, but he is kidnapped by the henchmen of ex-home minister Naagender, who is revealed to be the mastermind behind Rajagopal's murder. Aadhya requests the judge to give them more time and he accepts. Chandraiah is killed by Kishore, who fakes a report that he died in riots. Aadhya and Surya find out that Naagender ordered Kishore to kill Rajagopal. Before Rajagopal's death, five years ago, Naagender's land scandals was brought to light by the government. To divert the media's attention, Naagender got Rajagopal killed, because of his popularity and good image amongst the people and in the state. Aadhya and Surya nearly succeed in exposing Naagender and request permission to tap Naagender's phone calls, to prove him guilty. A night before the court appearance, Surya is kidnapped by Naagender, who blackmails Aadhya to withdraw the case, but upon being inspired by Surya, Aadhya carries on with the prosecution. Though injured, Surya successfully frees himself, defeating Naagender's henchmen. He reaches the court, where he is admitted to the hospital and is saved from his injuries. Naagender and Kishore are successfully proven to be guilty, by Aadhya. They receive a life imprisonment and death penalty, respectively.

Cast 
 Allari Naresh as Bandi Surya Prakash
 Varalaxmi Sarathkumar as Adv. Aadhya Mullapudi, Surya's defence lawyer
 Praveen as Santosh, Surya's best friend and helper
 Harish Uthaman as CI Kishore, a corrupt police officer
 Vinay Varma as Naagender, a corrupt ex-home minister
 Priyadarshi Pulikonda as Radha Prakash, Aadhya's aid
 Srikanth Iyengar as Public Prosecutor Satyamurthy
 Navami Gayak as Meenakshi, Surya's ex-fiancée
 C. V. L. Narasimha Rao as Adv. Rajagopal, a social activist
 Rajyalakshmi as Rajagopal's wife 
 Ananda Chakrapani as Meenakshi's father
 Devi Prasad as Surya's father
 Pramodini as Surya's mother
 Mani Chandana as Meenakshi's mother
 Krishneswara Rao as Chandraiah

Production

Development 
The film is Vijay Kanakamedala's directorial debut. Naresh, who is known for his comic roles, is cast as an under trial prisoner. Varalaxmi Sarathkumar is seen as an advocate that helps the falsely convicted victims. Srikanth Iyengar is a crooked lawyer while Priyadarshi is seen as a controversial YouTuber.

Principal photography 
Principal photography of the film began in January 2020 at Ramanaidu Studios in Hyderabad with the first schedule completed by February 2020. Filming also took place in an Aluminum factory in the city. Nearly 80% of the shoot was completed by June 2020.

Soundtrack

Reception

Critical reception 
The Times of India'''s Thadhagath Pathi rated the film 3.5 out of 5 stars and stated, "A film like this demands excellent writing and that is what Vijay excels at. He tells a story that goes beyond the usual tropes of a man wronged getting a bail and seeking revenge." Sangeetha Devi in her review for The Hindu, wrote "Naandhi marks the arrival of Vijay Kanakamedala as a director with promise and reinforces how good an actor Naresh is. This will go down as one of his career-best performances."

Vishwanath Vijayanagaram of The New Indian Express opined: "Despite being well-intentioned, Naandhi'' lacks both the consistency of a courtroom drama and the maturity of a legal procedural." Vijayanagaram rated the film 2.5/5 and added, "Composer Sricharan Pakala rises above the mediocre script and deserves kudos for this. Besides Naresh and Varu, Vinay Varma, Harish Uthaman, and Priyadarshi too deliver nice performances."

Box office
The film grossed 6.4 crore in the first week. It is Naresh's first commercially successful film after nearly 8 years.

References

External links
 

Indian crime thriller films
2020s Telugu-language films
Films shot in Hyderabad, India
Films set in Hyderabad, India
Films about social issues in India
Indian courtroom films
2021 crime drama films
2021 directorial debut films
Films about police brutality
Films set in prison
Indian prison films
Films scored by Sricharan Pakala